Innisfail may refer to:
Innisfail, Queensland, a town in the Cassowary Coast Region, Australia
Innisfail, Alberta, town in Canada
Inisfail, poetic name for Ireland
Innisfails, team which competed in the St. Louis Soccer League from 1907 to 1921
Innisfails GAA, Gaelic games club in based in Balgriffin, Fingal, Ireland

See also
Innisfil, town in Ontario, Canada